Neaphaenops tellkampfii is a species of beetle in the family Carabidae, the only species in the genus Neaphaenops.

References

Trechinae